Alan Tynan is an Irish hurler and footballer who plays club hurling for Roscrea and at inter-county level with the Tipperary senior hurling team. He previously played rugby with the Munster academy and was also part of the Tipperary minor football team that played in the 2015 All-Ireland Minor Football Final.

Career
On 12 February 2023, he made his league debut for Tipperary in the second round of the 2023 National Hurling League against Kilkenny, scoring a point as Tipperary won by 2–24 to 1–21.

References

Living people
Tipperary inter-county hurlers
Roscrea hurlers
Year of birth missing (living people)